Erika Elizabeth Feller  (born 1949) is an Australian academic, diplomat and lawyer. From 2006 to 2013, she was Assistant High Commissioner for Protection with the United Nations High Commissioner for Refugees. She is currently the Vice-Chancellor's Fellow at the University of Melbourne.

References

1949 births
Living people
Academic staff of the University of Melbourne
University of Melbourne alumni
University of Melbourne women
United Nations High Commissioner for Refugees officials
Australian women lawyers
Australian people of German descent
Australian officials of the United Nations
Officers of the Order of Australia